Jill Suzanne Barnholtz-Sloan is an American biostatistician and data scientist specialized in cancer epidemiology and etiologic investigations of brain tumors. She is a senior investigator and associate director for informatics and data science at the National Cancer Institute.

Life 
Barnholtz was born to Barbara Barnholtz, a Jewish Community Center assistant developmental director and Martin Barnholtz, a Creve Coeur city councilor. She completed a M.S. in statistics from the University of Texas at Austin. Barnholtz earned a Ph.D. in biostatistics from the UTHealth School of Public Health. Her 2000 dissertation was titled Traditional linkage analysis in admixed families. Ranajit Chakraborty was her doctoral advisor. Her academic advisor was Ralph Frankowski. In June 2000, she married physician-scientist and neurosurgeon Andrew E. Sloan at the Missouri Botanical Garden.

In 2002, Barnholtz-Sloan was an assistant professor at the Karmanos Cancer Institute. In 2007, she joined the Case Comprehensive Cancer Center. She worked in multiple roles in the Case Western Reserve University School of Medicine (CWRU) and the University Hospitals Health System (UHHS), which all focused on optimizing the use of data and analytics to advance health care. She has experience with multi-site, brain tumor, patient recruitment, and biological specimen collection, storage, and clinical annotation.  She held the Sally S. Morley Designated Professorship/Chair at CWRU.

Barnholtz-Sloan joined the National Cancer Institute (NCI) in 2021, with a joint appointment as associate director for informatics and data science, in the center for biomedical informatics and information technology and senior investigator in the division of cancer epidemiology and genetics (DCEG). Her research portfolio includes descriptive epidemiology studies and etiologic investigations of brain tumors.

See also 

 List of women in statistics
 Women in computing

References 

Living people
Year of birth missing (living people)
Place of birth missing (living people)
University of Texas at Austin alumni
UTHealth School of Public Health alumni
Case Western Reserve University faculty
National Institutes of Health people
21st-century American women scientists
Cancer epidemiologists
Women data scientists
American women statisticians
21st-century American mathematicians
American women epidemiologists
American epidemiologists
Jewish American scientists
21st-century American Jews
Jewish women scientists
Wayne State University faculty
Biostatisticians